The 1991 Italian Grand Prix (formally the Coca-Cola 62º Gran Premio d'Italia) was a Formula One motor race held at Monza on 8 September 1991. It was the twelfth race of the 1991 Formula One World Championship.

The 53-lap race was won by British driver Nigel Mansell, driving a Williams-Renault, after he started from second position. Drivers' Championship leader, Brazilian Ayrton Senna, finished second in his McLaren-Honda, having started from pole position, with Frenchman Alain Prost third in a Ferrari. The win, Mansell's fourth of the season, enabled him to reduce Senna's championship lead to 18 points with four races remaining.

Pre-race
The big news between the Belgian and Italian Grands Prix revolved around young Michael Schumacher, who had made his debut for Jordan in Belgium. Schumacher had signed for Benetton while still being under contract to Jordan. After much legal wrangling the German was confirmed at Benetton, while Roberto Moreno went the other way, taking Schumacher's place at Jordan. Elsewhere Michael Bartels was back at Lotus, as Johnny Herbert had more commitments in Japanese Formula 3000.

Qualifying

Pre-qualifying report
It was a third 1–2 in a row for Brabham in the Friday morning pre-qualifying session, with Mark Blundell back on top of the time sheets, eight tenths of a second faster than Martin Brundle. Olivier Grouillard was again third fastest for Fondmetal, his fifth pre-qualifying success of the season. Michele Alboreto took the last pre-qualification position in the Footwork, 1.5 seconds off Blundell's pace.

In his best pre-qualifying performance in his four attempts so far, Fabrizio Barbazza just missed out in fifth place in the AGS, albeit 1.6 seconds slower than Alboreto. His team-mate Gabriele Tarquini debuted the new JH27 car, but its engine failed on the first lap. Tarquini reverted to the JH25B, but could only manage sixth fastest. Alex Caffi was a couple of tenths of a second further back in seventh in the other Footwork, while Pedro Chaves remained stuck in the pits after the worn engine in his Coloni refused to start.

Pre-qualifying classification

Qualifying report
In qualifying, Ayrton Senna took pole again, with title rival Nigel Mansell second, the Englishman complaining of traffic on his final two hot laps. Gerhard Berger was third, followed by Riccardo Patrese, Alain Prost, Jean Alesi, Schumacher, Nelson Piquet, in his 200th Grand Prix, Moreno, and Pierluigi Martini, in the Ferrari powered Minardi.

Qualifying classification

Race

Race report
At the start Senna got away well from Mansell, Berger, Patrese, and Alesi, with everyone making it through the Rettifilo double chicane. Moreno was an early casualty as he spun off on lap 2 with the Jordan's suspension breaking just before the spin also just behind the leaders.

Patrese at the front started to charge, first he disposed of Berger, and then Mansell. Martini had spun off in the Minardi by lap 8 at Roggia behind the leaders. On lap 26 Patrese passed Senna at the Ascari chicane, but on the following lap a gearbox failure took him out. Senna now led from Mansell and Berger, with Mansell pressuring Senna for the lead, and on lap 34 he took it with a perfectly timed out-braking manoeuvre going into the Ascari chicane. Senna proceeded to pit for tyres and emerged down in fifth place, but in no mood to stay there. Senna proceeded to pass Schumacher going into Ascari, and then slipstreamed passed Berger into the first corner, and got back to second by passing arch-rival Prost going into the second chicane. Mansell meanwhile cruised to victory from Senna, Prost, Berger (despite pulling off just after the start/finish line with electrical problems), Schumacher, and Piquet, Alesi having retired with a blown engine. With four races to go Senna still led Mansell by 18 points, but this race confirmed that Mansell and Williams could beat Senna's McLaren in a straight fight.

Race classification

Championship standings after the race

Drivers' Championship standings

Constructors' Championship standings

References

Italian Grand Prix
Italian Grand Prix
Grand Prix
Italian Grand Prix